Percival Hill (born 4 July 1868, Kent Town, Adelaide, South Australia, died 24 July 1950, Adelaide) was a cricketer.

The brother of Australia captain Clem, Percival Hill was a right-handed batsman. He played one first-class match for South Australia, making just 2 runs in his only innings.

References

External links
 
 

1868 births
1950 deaths
Australian cricketers
South Australia cricketers
Cricketers from Adelaide